Ahorn is the German-language word for Maple

Ahorn may refer to:

Mountains
Ahorn, mountain in the Napf region, Switzerland
Ahorn-Alp, mountain in the Napf region, Switzerland
Ahornspitze, mountain in the Zillertal Alps, Tyrol, Austria

Towns
Ahorn, Austria
Ahorn, village and municipality of Bad Ischl, Austria
Ahorn, village and municipality of Lunz am See, Austria
Ahorn, Baden-Württemberg, Germany
Ahorn, Bavaria, Germany
Ahorn, hamlet in the Schwende District, Switzerland